The Indonesian Air Force Doctrine, Education and Training Development Command, abbreviated as Kodiklatau, is the Main Command for the Development of the Indonesian Air Force which is directly under the Air Force Chief of Staff. Kodiklatau is tasked with organizing first education, formation, development, specialization, transition and other education in order to improve the quality of Indonesian Air Force personnel and carry out the development of an education system, didactic, educational method, and aerospace science as well as fostering aerospace potential within the Kodiklatau and its staff.

This command is led by a Commander with the rank of Air Vice-Marshal and Deputy Commander with the rank of Air Commodore.

Vision and mission

Vision
Realization of human resources for the Indonesian Air Force who have the spirit of Sapta Marga, professional, efficient and effective in order to be able to face the challenges of future tasks.

Mission
In order to realize Kodiklatau's vision, Kodiklatau's mission was determined as follows:
 Carry out first education, formation, development, specialization, transition and other education in a professional, effective, efficient and modern manner.
 Carry out studies, development and coaching of the ten components of education in order to create innovative and creative ideas for the benefit of improving education administration.
 Increase cooperation in the field of education with relevant agencies within and outside the Indonesian Air Force for the benefit of the successful implementation of education.
 Improving the function of planning, control and supervision within the Kodiklatau environment through information on the performance accountability system of government agencies.

Organization

Education Center

Other

See also 
 National Air Operations Command
 Indonesian Air Force

References

External links 
  Official webpage

Indonesian Air Force